Father's House is a South Korean year-end drama special.  
Reruns were aired on New Year’s Day.

Plot
The story revolves on the life of Kang Man Ho (Choi Min-soo), who had a one-night stand with a pianist, Lee Hyun Jae (Moon Jung-hee). But because he needs to serve some time in prison, it wasn't until he got released that he realizes he had become a father;the mother has dropped off the boy with his closest relations (with a man that is like a father figure to Choi) and headed back home to the U.S. Although he didn't feel an immediate love for his son, the bond is solidified when both survived a bus crash, and after that near-death experience, he became determined to be a loving father.

Cast
Choi Min-soo as Kang Man-ho
Moon Jeong-hee as Lee Hyun-jae
Kim Soo-hyun as Kang Jae-il
Park Chang-ik as young Kang Jae-il
Baek Il-seob as Kang Soo-bok
Park Won-sook as Soon-ae
Ahn Jung-hoon as Park Jin-woo
Yoo Ho-jin as Mi-ae
Kim Gyu-jin
Jung Hye-sun
Kang Soo-han
 Kim Sung-oh as Steven

Episode Ratings

References

External links 
Father's House official SBS website 

2009 South Korean television series debuts
Seoul Broadcasting System television dramas
Korean-language television shows
2009 South Korean television series endings